Carsten Niemitz (born 29 September 1945 in Dessau) is a German anatomist, ethologist, and human evolutionary biologist.

Life and work
Niemitz studied biology, mathematics, medicine and art history at the Universities of Giessen, Freiburg, Göttingen and at the Free University of Berlin. He graduated in Biology in 1970. From 1968 to 1971 he was employed at the Max Planck Institute for Brain Research in Frankfurt. He spent the years 1971 to 1973 in the jungle of Sarawak on Borneo. After returning to Germany he was awarded his doctorate in biology in 1974. In 1975 he qualified to teach anatomy and until 1978 was lecturer at the Anatomical Institute of the University of Göttingen. At the age of 32 he was appointed Professor of Human Biology at the Free University of Berlin, a post he held as head of the Institute until 2010. In 1987 he was consultant to the IUCN as a member of the Species Survival Commission. In 1993 he was appointed as professor of zoology at the University of Essen and was a visiting professor of Systematic Zoology and Evolutionary Biology at the University of Potsdam. During a research trip in 1991 to Sulawesi, he discovered the primate Tarsius dianae. In 1996 he introduced in the Anthropological Society a proposal to ban the use of the term "race", which was later adopted officially by the society.

In addition to his field research on primates and the study of biomechanics, one of his research interests was the origin of language and writing, with investigation into communication amongst anthropoid apes. He was one of those who regarded facial expressions and gestures as a precursor of human writing skills. In brief, his thesis was that the abilities to read and write are biologically older than those of language, because such visual communication was later supplemented by vocal and acoustic signals.

In the late eighties and the nineties he was one of those who raised the alarm about the depletion of tropical rain forests. From 2000 Niemitz developed an "amphibious" theory of the evolution of upright human posture and walking erect, according to which "there was a period in our evolution when it was wading and shore use which in a sustained and substantial way helped to shape today's people". Niemitz rejects the more extensive aquatic ape hypothesis, which accepts a real aquatic (water living) phase in human evolution. His publication list includes over 350 titles and many books. He also became active as a translator and as a writer of textbooks and for radio, film and television.

Memberships
From 1992 Niemitz was deputy chairman, from 1994 to 1998 chairman of the Anthropological Society and from 2008 to 2010 chairman of the Berlin Society for Anthropology, Ethnology and Prehistory (BGAEU). From 1992 to 2014, he was deputy chairman of the  Urania cultural community in Berlin, a center for the exchange between science and the public. Together with Nils Seethaler and Benjamin P. Lange he organized the 11th MVE annual conference in Berlin in 2010. He has been since 2013 Patron of the friends' association of the Julius Riemer collection in the Museum of the Municipal Collections in the "Armory" (Museum der städtischen Sammlungen im Zeughaus) in Lutherstadt Wittenberg.

Works 
 Zur Biometrie der Gattung Tarsius Storr, 1780 (Tarsiiformes, Tarsiidae). Eine funktionsmorphologische Studie als Beitrag zur Systematik und Phylogenie der Koboldmakis unter Verwendung elektronischer Rechenmittel mit dem Versuch einer Synopse morphologischer und ethologischer Ergebnisse. Dissertation, Gießen 1974
 Zur Funktionsmorphologie und Biometrie der Gattung Tarsius Storr, 1780 (Mammalia, Primates, Tarsiidae). Herleitung von Evolutionsmechanismen bei einem Primaten. Courier Forschungsinstitut Senckenberg 25, 1977

 Erbe und Umwelt. Zur Natur von Anlage und Selbstbestimmung des Menschen. Verlag Suhrkamp, Frankfurt am Main, 1987, 2. Auflage, 1989
 Das Regenwaldbuch. Verlag Parey, Berlin und Hamburg 1990, 
  
 mit Sigrun Niemitz: Genforschung und Gentechnik. Ängste und Hoffnungen. Springer Verlag, Berlin 1999

 Das Geheimnis des aufrechten Gangs. Unsere Evolution verlief anders. C.H. Beck, München 2004, 
 Brennpunkte und Perspektiven der aktuellen Anthropologie = Focuses and perspectives of modern physical anthropology. Verlag Leidorf, 2006, 
 mit K. Kreutz und H. Walther: "Wider den Rassenbegriff in der Anwendung auf den Menschen". Anthropologischer Anzeiger 64, Nr. 4 (2006): 463–464

Film 
Das Geheimnis des aufrechten Gangs. Dokumentarfilm, Deutschland, 2011, 43 Min., Regie: Ingo Knopf, Jo Siegler, Produktion: Maakii Filmproduktion, WDR, arte (Inhaltsangabe von arte)

References

External links 
 
 Vortrag: Das Geheimnis des aufrechten Gangs – idw

German anatomists
German anthropologists
21st-century German biologists
People from Dessau-Roßlau
1945 births
Living people
University of Giessen alumni
University of Freiburg alumni
University of Göttingen alumni
Free University of Berlin alumni
Academic staff of the Free University of Berlin
Academic staff of the University of Göttingen
Academic staff of the University of Potsdam
20th-century German biologists